Lake Elmo State Park is a public recreation area located on the northeast side of Billings, Montana. It offers non-motorized boating on a  reservoir, three beach-front areas, fishing pier, grassed multi-use areas, two group-use shelters, playground, and fenced-in dog park on the lake's west side.

References

External links 

Lake Elmo State Park Montana Fish, Wildlife & Parks
Lake Elmo State Park Trail Map Montana Fish, Wildlife & Parks

State parks of Montana
Billings, Montana
Protected areas of Yellowstone County, Montana
Protected areas established in 1983